Dick House is a historic home located at Germantown in Columbia County, New York.  It was built about 1860 and is five bays wide and two bays deep with a gable roof. There is a flat roofed west wing.  It has a center hall plan with Italianate style detailing on the interior.

It was added to the National Register of Historic Places in 2009.

References

Houses on the National Register of Historic Places in New York (state)
Italianate architecture in New York (state)
Houses completed in 1860
Houses in Columbia County, New York
National Register of Historic Places in Columbia County, New York